Below are the squads for the Football at the 2007 Southeast Asian Games, hosted by Thailand, which took place between 1 and 14 December 2007.

Group A

Thailand 
Coach:  Thongsuk Sampahungsith

Indonesia 
Coach:  Ivan Kolev

Myanmar 
Head Coach: U San Win

Cambodia 
Coach:  Scott O'Donell

Group B

Vietnam 
Coach:  Alfred Riedl

Singapore 
Coach:  Raddy Avramovic

Malaysia 
Coach:  B. Sathianathan and Norizan Bakar

Laos 
Coach:  Saysana Savatdy

References

Football at the 2007 Southeast Asian Games